András László (born 16 August 1976) is a Hungarian former football defender who last played for BFC Siófok.

References 
HLSZ 
MLSZ 

1976 births
Living people
People from Veszprém
Hungarian footballers
Association football defenders
BFC Siófok players
Soproni FAC footballers
Vasas SC players
Debreceni VSC players
Zalaegerszegi TE players
FC Sopron players
Budapest Honvéd FC players
Sportspeople from Veszprém County